Puccio Pucci (Florence, 1 September 1389 – 7 May 1449) was a Florentine politician and the founder of the main branch of the Pucci family.

1389 births
1449 deaths
Puccio